MMZ may refer to:

 Mega Man Zero
 Mega Man Zero (series), a series of video games released by Capcom for the Game Boy Advance
 Mega Man Zero (video game), the first video game in the series
 MMZ (motorcycle), a motorcycle manufacturer based in Moscow
 BELOMO, an old name for the Belarusian company